The Post Office v Roberts [1980] IRLR 347 is a UK labour law case, concerning mutual trust and confidence.

Facts
Ms Roberts claimed that her employer breached a duty of mutual trust and confidence. A Post Office supervisor, Mr O’Keefe, wrote on Ms Roberts’ personal records, without any basis, that she was irresponsible, lacked industry and comprehension skills, and this hindered her application for an office transfer.

Judgment
Talbot J held that the Post Office breached mutual trust and confidence by recording unfounded criticism of its employee. He said ‘We do not think it helpful’ to ask if the ‘behaviour was deliberate or malicious’. It was only relevant that mutual trust and confidence is breached.

See also

UK labour law

Notes

References
E McGaughey, A Casebook on Labour Law (2019) 223

United Kingdom labour case law